Iodocephalus is a genus of flowering plants in the daisy family.

Species
There is only one known species, Iodocephalus gracilis, native to Indochina.

formerly included
 Iodocephalus eberhardtii (Gagnep.) S. Bunwong & H.Rob. - Iodocephalopsis eberhardtii (Gagnep.) S. Bunwong & H. Rob.
 Iodocephalus glandulosus Kerr - Iodocephalopsis eberhardtii (Gagnep.) S. Bunwong & H. Rob.

References

Vernonieae
Flora of Indo-China
Monotypic Asteraceae genera